Wisdom Gymnasium is a 3,000 seat multi-purpose arena in Stephenville, Texas. It was built in 1970. It is the home of the Tarleton State University Texans basketball teams and volleyball team.  Wisdom Gymnasium is named for long-time Tarleton athletics director and coach W.J. Wisdom.

The gym often holds FFA contests, college tours, freshman transitioning week activities, graduation, homecoming activities, and workshops. The gym also serves as a building for Kinesiology classes.

References

External links
Official site

College basketball venues in the United States
Sports venues in Texas
Basketball venues in Texas
Indoor arenas in Texas
Volleyball venues in Texas
Sports venues completed in 1970
1970 establishments in Texas
College volleyball venues in the United States
Buildings and structures in Erath County, Texas
Tarleton State Texans basketball